Lord Hill may refer to:

 Baron Hill, a title held by several people
 Viscount Hill, a title held by several people

See also
 Lord Hill's Column in Shrewsbury, UK, named after 1st Viscount Hill
 Lord Hill Regional Park in Snohomish County, Washington, U.S.
 Lord Hill-Norton